Raman Subba Row  (born 29 January 1932) is a former cricketer who played for England, Cambridge University, Surrey and Northamptonshire.

Life and career
Born in Streatham, Surrey, England to an Indian father Panguluri Venkata Subba Rao, of Bapatla, Andhra Pradesh and English mother, Doris Mildred Pinner, Subba Row was educated at Whitgift School and Cambridge University. 

A left-handed opening batsman and occasional leg-spin and googly bowler, Subba Row was a member of the powerful Cambridge side of the early 1950s and played a few games for Surrey before joining Northamptonshire. Taking over as captain in 1958, he led the side for four seasons and achieved considerable success as a batsman, scoring the county's highest ever innings, 260 not out, in 1955 and then bettering it with 300 against Surrey, the County Champions, at the Oval in 1958, when he shared a record sixth wicket stand of 376 with Albert Lightfoot.

Subba Row played in thirteen Test matches for England, opening the batting regularly from 1959 to 1961. He scored centuries in his first Test against the Australians in 1961, and in his last match against them at the Oval.

He was one of the Wisden Cricketers of the Year in 1961.

At the end of the 1961 season, he retired rather abruptly and prematurely from first-class cricket at the age of 29, to go into the public relations business, joining WS Crawfords advertising agency in Holborn. In later years, he was Chairman of Surrey (1974–78) and an influential figure at Lord's. He also served as Chairman of the TCCB, and as an ICC match referee.

There is a conference room named after him in Whitgift School.

He was appointed CBE in the 1991 New Year Honours.

References

External links
 

1932 births
Living people
People from Streatham
People educated at Whitgift School
Cambridge University cricketers
English cricket administrators
England Test cricketers
Northamptonshire cricket captains
Northamptonshire cricketers
Surrey cricketers
Combined Services cricketers
Commonwealth XI cricketers
Wisden Cricketers of the Year
Commanders of the Order of the British Empire
English cricketers
Marylebone Cricket Club cricketers
Gentlemen cricketers
Alumni of Trinity Hall, Cambridge
A. E. R. Gilligan's XI cricketers
British sportspeople of Indian descent
British Asian cricketers